Bandslam is the soundtrack album for Summit Entertainment's movie of the same name. The soundtrack was released on August 11, 2009 through Hollywood Records.

Despite its good reviews, the soundtrack album failed to chart within the Billboard 200. The movie failed to chart in the top 10 in the United States, grossing $12,231,273 on its opening weekend while distributed at 2,121 theatres.

Album information 
The soundtrack features tracks from the Burning Hotels, the Velvet Underground and David Bowie. Mitchell Leib, president of music and soundtracks at Walt Disney Pictures, describes the album as a "real music picture in a way Cameron Crowe would make a music picture".

Track listing

Charts

Critical reception 

Entertainment Weeklys Leah Greenblatt praises Hudgens and Michalka's singing abilities in Bread's "Everything I Own" and Cheap Trick's "I Want You to Want Me", while Allmusic's Heather Phares remarks that "Bandslam tries to be and do a lot of things, and while it doesn't always succeed, it works well enough that fans of the movie (and their parents) won't be disappointed by the soundtrack." Michael Rechtshaffen wrote on his review, that the soundtrack is "authentic" and "eclectic".

 Personnel 
The following people contributed to the album:
 Executive Producer – Todd Graff
 Soundtrack Producer – Lindsay Fellows
 Producers – John Fields, Adam Lasus, Joseph Magee, Jasmina Kopic
 Music Supervisor - Lindsay Fellows
 Soundtrack Director - Desirée Craig Ramos
 Music Clearance - Christine Bergren
 Mixing - Paul David Hager, Joseph Magee
 Mastering – Patricia Sullivan
 Engineers – John Fields
 Liner Notes - Todd Graff
 Design' - Enny Joo

Release history

References 

2009 soundtrack albums
Hollywood Records soundtracks
Rock soundtracks
Musical film soundtracks
Drama film soundtracks
Comedy film soundtracks